Victor Saunders is a British mountaineer and author. He trained as an architect at the Architectural Association School of Architecture in London. His first book, Elusive Summits, won the Boardman Tasker Prize for Mountain Literature in 1991. He became as a UIAGM/IFMGA ski and mountain guide in 1996 and joined the SNGM (National Syndicate of French Mountain Guides) in 2003.  Saunders first reached the summit of Mount Everest in May 2004, and went on to climb it several more times. In 2020 he became president of the Alpine Club.

He lives in Les Houches, near Chamonix, France.

Notable climbs
The climbs are listed in date order.
 2017 - Mount Tyree
 2016 - Sersank Peak
 2016 - Carstensz Pyramid-Puncak Java
 2014 - Mount McKinley-Denali
 2013 - Aconcagua
 2013 - Chamsen
 2012 - Mount Elbrus
 2012 - Dykh-Tau
 2010 - Everest 
 2007 - Ama Dablam
 2007 - Everest
 2006 - Everest
 2005 - Everest
 2004 - Ama Dablam
 2004 - Everest 
 1997 - Cho Oyu
 1996 - Mustagh Ata
 1995 - Bhutan
 1995 - Ecuador Volcanoes, Chimborazo and Cotopaxi
 1994 - Panch Chuli Trek
 1994 - Hatezan Zom
 1993 - Bhutan Basingtang 
 1993 - Gondoro La
 1993 - K2 - Saunders returned from 8000m during rescue operations.
 1992 - Panch Chuli V - first ascent, with Dick Renshaw, Stephen Sustad & Stephen Venables
 1992 - Rajramba - New route up SE Ridge with Dick Renshaw, Stephen Sustad & Stephen Venables
 1991 - Elbrus
 1991 - Karakoram
 1991 - Ultar
 1989 - Kangchuntse, a subsidiary summit of Makalu - First ascent of West Face with Stephen Sustad
 1988 - Jitchu Drake - First ascent
 1987 - Golden Pillar of Spantik, Pakistan - First ascent with Mick Fowler
 1986 - Ushba - West Face Direct
 1986 - The Icicle Factory and White Wedding Cuillin, Isle of Skye - First ascents, with Mick Fowler
 1985 - Rimo I - attempt with Stephen Venables
 1984 - Bojohagur Duanisir - attempt with Phil Butler
 1978 - Eiger - North Face in winter, with Stevie Haston
 1978 - Shield Direct, Ben Nevis - the first route on Ben Nevis to be graded VI

Publications
Elusive Summits: Four Expeditions in the Karakoram, 1990 
Trekking and Climbing in the Andes (Trekking and Climbing Guides), 2002, by Kate Harper, Val Pitkethly and Victor Saunders
Alpes Occidentales: Trekking y Alpinismo, 2002, by Victor Saunders and Hilary Sharp
Himalaya: The Tribulations of Mick & Vic co-written with Mick Fowler, which won the Grand Prize at the Passy International Mountain Book Festival, 2015
No Place to Fall: Superalpinism in the High Himalaya, 2017
Structured Chaos: The Unusual Life of a Climber, Vertebrate Publishing, 2021

See also
List of Mount Everest summiters by number of times to the summit
Saunders occasionally leads commercial trekking and climbing expeditions, such as to K2 in 2023.

References

External links
Company website
Personal website

Living people
Year of birth missing (living people)
Boardman Tasker Prize winners
English mountain climbers
English male non-fiction writers
20th-century English male writers
English non-fiction outdoors writers